Eugène Colson (Charleroi, 1913 - Antwerp, 2000), known by the alias "Harry", was a noted member of the Belgian Resistance during World War II. An employee of the port of Antwerp during the German occupation, Colson formed a resistance cell affiliated to the Nationale Koninklijke Beweging (NKB) group.

During the liberation of Belgium, Colson played an important role in preventing the German destruction of the port. As a result, the Canadian troops which entered the city in September 1944 were able to capture the facility intact.

External links
Whitaker, Shelagh (1994) "Eugene Colson and the Liberation of the Port of Antwerp," Canadian Military History: Vol. 3: Iss. 2, Article 9.
Inventaris archief Eugène ‘Harry’ COLSON

Belgian resistance members
People from Charleroi
1913 births
2000 deaths